The Ōnawe Peninsula is a volcanic plug inside Akaroa Harbour, on Banks Peninsula in Canterbury, New Zealand. It is the site of a former pā (a Māori village). It is part of the Banks Peninsula Volcano.

The New Zealand Ministry for Culture and Heritage explains that the name Ōnawe is made up of "Ō" meaning "place of" and "nawe" meaning "to set on fire". 

It was the site of a Ngāi Tahu pā captured by Te Rauparaha, chief of the Ngāti Toa in 1831. Up to 1,200 people were killed here, and the land is sacred to Ngāi Tahu so "is deemed to be vested in Te Runanga o Ngāi Tahu" as part of the Ngāi Tahu Waitangi claims settlement in 1998.

References

Peninsulas of New Zealand
Volcanic plugs of New Zealand
Rock formations of Canterbury, New Zealand
Akaroa